The Melbourne Queer Games Festival is an annual LGBT game festival held in Melbourne, Victoria, Australia. It was founded in 2018 and is held in October as a part of the Melbourne International Games Week. It showcases video and tabletop games from around the world that feature LGBT gameplay elements

The festival is volunteer led and in addition to appealing to the queer gaming community and raise the profile of queer games, they're working toward reclaiming the phrase "gay games".

Format
The festival publishes a showcase of games submitted, a livestream of games being played, and a series of juried awards and launched with fifty games in its inaugural year. In 2018 it ran a "Bring It Back" event highlighting an older game, Lesbian Spider-Queens of Mars.

Jury-voted awards
The Festival recognizes several categories of awards: technical, jury, bronze, silver and gold.

References

External links
 Melbourne Queer Games Festival website

Video game festivals
LGBT culture in Melbourne
Video gaming in Australia
Festivals in Melbourne
LGBT events in Australia